Khrystyana Kazakova (born ) is a Russian model involved actively in the body positive movement.

Early and personal life 
Kazakova was born in Siberia, then she grew up in Ukraine. Her parents divorced when she was 15, where she stayed with her mother. Later on, her mother moved in with a Portuguese who lived in Hawaii, since then she moved to the United States. She resides in New York.

Career 
Kazakova was the last eliminated on the 24th season of America’s Next Top Model. In 2017, she created The Real Catwalk, a series of fashion shows to celebrate all sizes and ethnicities. The shows have taken place in New York City and in London. In 2018, she also teamed up with photographer Peter DeVito to create “More Than Just a Trend.” The photo series address stereotypes about gender, diversity, and sexuality.

She has signed to be a model with One Management, Natural Models LA, Model Werk, Bridge Models and Nomad Management. Kazakova has appeared in ads for Warner’s, Aerie, Ellos, Skims, Target and Khloe Kardashian's brand, Good American. She also featured as Playboy's November 2020 playmate.

References 

	
1980s births
Living people
Russian female models
America's Next Top Model contestants
Plus-size models
2020s Playboy Playmates